Friday Night Football may refer to:

 Friday Night Football (AFL), Australia
 Friday Night Football (NRL), Australia
 Friday Night Football, the Friday installment of CFL on TSN, Canada
 Friday Night Football, a programme on STV Sports Centre, Scotland